The Webb Brothers were an Australian family country music band originating out of Queensland.

The first song they wrote and recorded, "Call of the Bellbird", had sold 40,000 copies by the end of 1959.

References

Australian country music groups
Queensland musical groups
Musical groups established in 1952
Musical groups disestablished in 2014